Lanmérin is a commune in the Côtes-d'Armor department of Brittany in northwestern France.

Population

Inhabitants of Lanmérin are called lanmérinois in French.

See also
Communes of the Côtes-d'Armor department

References

External links

Official website 

Communes of Côtes-d'Armor
Côtes-d'Armor communes articles needing translation from French Wikipedia